Schoenobius molybdoplecta is a moth in the family Crambidae. It was described by Harrison Gray Dyar Jr. in 1914. It is found in Panama.

The wingspan is 14–24 mm. The forewings are dark grey, the inner area shaded with dull yellow. The hindwings are whitish, shading to fuscous at the margin.

References

Moths described in 1914
Schoenobiinae